Stephens' constant expresses the density of certain subsets of the prime numbers. Let  and  be two multiplicatively independent integers, that is,  except when both  and  equal zero. Consider the set  of prime numbers  such that  evenly divides  for some power . The density of the set  relative to the set of all primes is a rational multiple of
 

Stephens' constant is closely related to the Artin constant  that arises in the study of primitive roots.

See also
Euler product
Twin prime constant

References

Algebraic number theory
Infinite products